Les Soleils des indépendances (The Suns of Independence) is the first novel by Ivorian author Ahmadou Kourouma. It won the Grand prix littéraire d'Afrique noire in 1969.

The title is a play on words involving the meaning of the Maninka word "télé", which can mean "sun", but also "day", "era" or "period [of time]".

Bibliography
Les Soleils des indépendances, Presses de l'Université de Montréal, 1968 
The Suns of Independence, Translator Adrian Adams, Holmes & Meier, 1981,

References

Ivorian novels
1968 novels
French-language novels
Grand prix littéraire d'Afrique noire winners
1968 debut novels